Probreviceps macrodactylus is a species of frog in the family Brevicipitidae. It is endemic to Tanzania.
Its natural habitats are subtropical or tropical moist lowland forests, subtropical or tropical moist montane forests, rural gardens, and heavily degraded former forest. It is threatened by habitat loss.

References

macrodactylus
Frogs of Africa
Amphibians of Tanzania
Endemic fauna of Tanzania
Amphibians described in 1926
Taxa named by Fritz Nieden
Taxonomy articles created by Polbot